Jarnail Singh may refer to: 

 Jarnail Singh Bhindranwale (1947–1984), religious leader
 Jarnail Singh (footballer) (1936–2000), captain of the India national football team from 1965 to 1967
 Jarnail Singh (referee) (born 1962), retired English association football referee of Indian descent
 Jarnail Singh (physician) (1953–2021), Singaporean physician specialised in aviation medicine
 Jarnail Singh (politician, born 1973) (1973–2021), AAP politician and the party's candidate in 2014 Lok Sabha elections
 Jarnail Singh (politician, born 1981), AAP politician and MLA from Tilak Nagar constituency

See also
 Gernail Singh, a 1987 Pakistani film